Elen Egryn, pen name of Elin (or Elinor) Evans, (1807–1876) was a Welsh poet. She was the first woman to have a book published in the Welsh language.

Biography

Ellen Egryn was the daughter of Ellis Humphrey Evans, a village schoolmaster, and his wife. She was brought up in western Wales in the little village Llanegryn, then in Merionethshire, where she learnt to write poetry as a child. She moved to Liverpool in 1840 but soon returned to Machynlleth not far from her home town. It was there that in 1850 she created the collection Telyn Egryn (Egryn's Harp), becoming the first woman ever to publish a secular Welsh-language book. Although she did not receive the same degree of attention as contemporary male poets, the work is considered to be a milestone in the history of women's literature in Wales. It presents a broad range of poetry covering bereavement, friendship, exile and depression, purposefully invoking an impression of the high moral standards enjoyed by Welsh women. Her poetry is closer to the work of 18th-century poets than to that of the Victorian poets who followed her in that she employed a level of language rooted in the pre-medieval period.

Also in 1850, in reaction to the publication of the Reports of the Commissioners of Inquiry into the state of education in Wales which severely criticized the loose morals and behaviour of Welsh women, Evan Jones (1820–1852) published Y Gymraes (The Welsh Women) which set out to defend the high principles of Welsh women. Elen Egryn contributed a poetic introduction to the first issue, in which she called for women to rise "above shame and hateful mockery" (goruwch gwarth a dirmyg cas).

Works

See also
Treachery of the Blue Books

References

1807 births
1876 deaths
19th-century Welsh poets
19th-century Welsh women writers
People from Merionethshire
Welsh-language poets
Welsh women poets